Obolella is a genus of Cambrian brachiopods.

References

Brachiopods of Europe
Cambrian brachiopods
Prehistoric brachiopod genera
Paleozoic life of Newfoundland and Labrador

Cambrian genus extinctions